The 2018–19 Persian Gulf Pro League (formerly known as Iran Pro League) was the 36th season of Iran's Football League and 18th as Persian Gulf Pro League since its establishment in 2001. Persepolis were the defending champions. The season featured 13 teams from the 2017–18 Persian Gulf Pro League and two new teams promoted from the 2017–18 Azadegan League: Naft Masjed Soleyman as champions and Nassaji Mazandaran. Machine Sazi replaced Gostaresh. The league started on 26 July 2018 and ended on 16 May 2019. Persepolis won the Pro League title for the fifth time in their history, a total 12th Iranian title.

Teams

Stadia and locations

Number of teams by region

Personnel and kits
Note: Flags indicate national team as has been defined under FIFA eligibility rules. Players may hold more than one non-FIFA nationality.

Managerial changes

Foreign players

The number of foreign players is restricted to four per Persian Gulf Pro League team, including a slot for a player from AFC countries. A team can use four foreign players on the field in each game, including at least one player from the AFC country. 
In bold: Players that have been capped for their national team.

League table

Results

Positions by round

Season statistics

Top scorers

Hat-tricks

Top assists

Clean Sheets

Scoring

Attendances

Average home attendances

Attendances by round

Notes:Updated to games played on 16 March 2019. Source: Iranleague.ir   Matches with spectator bans are not included in average attendances  Esteghlal Khuzestan played their matches against Foolad and Nassaji at Foolad Arena  Machine Sazi played their matches against Esteghlal Khuzestan and Tractor Sazi at Sahand  Saipa played their matches against Esteghlal and Persepolis at Takhti Tehran  Saipa played their matches against Foolad, Nassaji, Paykan, Padideh, Sanat Naft, Sepahan and Tractor Sazi at Shohada Shahr-e Qods  Sepahan played their match against Tractor Sazi at Foolad Shahr

Highest attendances

Notes:Updated to games played on 16 March 2019. Source: Iranleague.ir

Awards

IFLO Seasonal awards

Navad Monthly awards

See also 
 2018–19 Azadegan League
 2018–19 League 2
 2018–19 League 3
 2018–19 Hazfi Cup
 2018 Iranian Super Cup

References 

Iran Pro League seasons
1
Iran